Kotan Utunnai is an Ainu epic. It is a story of unknown authorship that deals with the hardships of war and desolation. The epic tells about the life of Poiyaunpe, or an unnamed character, a hero who grows up in a foreign land but discovers his Ainu ancestry and returns to his native people.

Plot 
The hero, who is the narrator and a Yaunkur, learns that the Repunkur killed his parents. Taking his father's war gear, he sets out to avenge their deaths. In Repunkur country, he finds his older brother imprisoned. With his sister's help, the hero frees his brother and kills his captors.

Characters 
 Nameless narrator
 Sister of the narrator
Brother of the narrator, Kamui-Otopush, a great Yaunkur warrior
 Dangling Nose (Etu Rachichi) of the Repunkur
 The Repunkur

References 

Ainu mythology